Kimmy Robertson is an American actress best known for her role as Lucy Moran in the TV series Twin Peaks and for the film The Last American Virgin.

Career

Robertson's high-pitched voice has led to roles in animated series such as Batman: The Animated Series, The Critic, The Tick and The Simpsons. Her voice also featured in Beauty and the Beast in 1991. From 1993 to 1995, Robertson voiced Penny on 2 Stupid Dogs''' Secret Squirrel segments. Robertson performed a short spoken-word segment on Roger McGuinn's 1990 album Back from Rio. In 2011, she started playing Penny Wise on the long-running radio series Adventures in Odyssey. Currently, since 2019, she voices the main role of Ollie in the animated series Ollie & Scoops''.

Filmography

Film

Television

Music videos

Theatre

References

External links

1954 births
Living people
Actresses from Hollywood, Los Angeles
American film actresses
American radio actresses
American television actresses
21st-century American women